François-Antoine (de) Chevrier (11 October 1721 – 26 June 1762) was an 18th-century French satirist and playwright. Adolphe van Bever defined him as "the most satirical and the least sociable".

Works 
 Pamphlets et romans
1745: Recueil de ces dames, Brussels, Paris, aux dépens de la Compagnie
1746: Bi-Bi, conte traduit du chinois par un Français. Première et peut-être dernière édition, à Mazuli, Khilo-Khula, l'an de Sal-Chodaï 623 [Paris]
1751: Voyage de Rogliano, par M. de Chevrier, Livorno, Imprimerie française
1752: Les Ridicules du siecle, London [Paris, Mérigot]
1752: Ma-gakou: histoire japonnoise, A Goa [Paris], Par exprès commandement de l'empereur
1752: Cela est singulier, histoire égyptienne, traduite par un rabbin génois, A Babylone, de l'Imprimerie royale [Paris], 1752
1753: Mémoires d'une honnête femme écrits par elle-même et publiés par M. de Chevrier, à Londres [Paris, Mérigot ou Sébastien Jorry]
1753: Le Quart d'heure d'une jolie femme, ou les Amusemens de la toilette, ouvrage presque moral dédié à Messieurs les habitans des coins du roi et de la reine, par Mademoiselle de *****, Geneva, A. Philibert, 1753
1755: Observations sur le théâtre, dans lesquelles on examine avec impartialité l'état actuel des spectacles de Paris, par M. de Chevrier, Paris, Debure le jeune
1761: Testament politique du maréchal duc de Belle-Isle
1762: Le Codicille, et l'esprit, ou Commentaire des maximes politiques de M. le maréchal duc de Bell'Isle, avec des notes apologétiques, historiques et critiques, le tout publié par M. D. C***, the Haye, Veuve Van Duren
1761: Le Colporteur, histoire morale et critique, à Londres, chez Jean Nourse, l'An de Vérité [The Hague]
1762: Almanach des gens d'esprit par un homme qui n'est par sot, calendrier pour l'année 1762 et le reste de la vie, publié par l'auteur du "Colporteur", Toujours à Londres [The Hague], chez l'éternel Jean Nourse
1762: Les Amusemens des dames de B***. Histoire honnête et presque édifiante, composée par feu le chevalier de Ch***** et publiée par l'auteur du "Colporteur", à Rouen, chez Pierre Le Vrai, cette présente année [The Hague]
1762–1763: L'Observateur des spectacles ou Anecdotes théâtrales, ouvrage périodique, par M. de Chevrier, La Haye, l'auteur ; Amsterdam, Henri Constapel, 3 vol.
 Theatre
1741: Le Feint normand
1746: L'Inconstant 
1749: Cargula 
1753: La Revue des théâtres
1754: Le Retour du goût 
1754: La Campagne 
1755: L'Épouse suivante
1755: Les Fêtes parisiennes
1757: La Petite maison 
 Poems
1758: L'Acadiade ou Prouesses angloises en Acadie, Canada &c. Poëme comi-héroïque, en quatre chants, par Mr. D***, Cassel [Paris], aux depens de l'auteur
1759: L'Albionide, ou l'Anglais démasqué, poëme héroï-comique relatif aux circonstances présentes, enrichi de notes historiques, politiques & critiques, par M. le comte de F.P.T., Aix, J. William
1759: L'Hanovriade, poëme héroi-burlesque en cinq chants, orné de notes historiques, allegoriques, morales et critiques, par l'auteur du poëme de l'Albionide, Closter-Seven, George De Bergen.

Bibliography 
 Ad. Van Bever, Le Colporteur par François-Antoine Chevrier. Réimprimé sur l'édition publiée à Londres, en 1762, avec une préface, des notes, des documents inédits et suivi d'un supplément, Paris, Bibliothèque des Curieux, 1904.
 Raymond Trousson, "François-Antoine Chevrier. Le Colporteur. Histoire morale et critique (1761)", in Romans libertins du XVIIIe, Paris, Robert Laffont, 1993, coll. "Bouquins".
 Jean-Claude Hauc, "François-Antoine Chevrier", in Aventuriers et libertins au siècle des Lumières, Paris, Éditions de Paris, 2009.

External links 
 François-Antoine Chevrier on CÉSAR
 François-Antoine Chevrier on Data.bnf.fr

1721 births
1762 deaths
Writers from Nancy, France
18th-century French dramatists and playwrights
18th-century French writers
18th-century French male writers
French pamphleteers
French satirists
French theatre critics
French male non-fiction writers